Nitrospirota is a phylum of bacteria. It includes multiple genera, such as Nitrospira, the largest. The first member of this phylum, Nitrospira marina, was discovered in 1985. The second member, Nitrospira moscoviensis, was discovered in 1995.

Nitrospirota contains nitrifying taxa which oxidize nitrite to nitrate (nitrite-oxidizing bacteria, NOB) and commamox bacteria Nitrospira inopinata discovered in 2015 and cultivated in 2017.

Phylogeny

Taxonomy
The currently accepted taxonomy is based on the List of Prokaryotic names with Standing in Nomenclature (LSPN) and the National Center for Biotechnology Information (NCBI).

 Phylum "Nitrospirota" Garrity & Holt 2021
 Class "Leptospirillia"
 Order "Leptospirillales"
 Family "Leptospirillaceae" Cavalier-Smith 2020
 Genus Leptospirillum Markosyan 1972 ex Hippe 2000
 Species "L. ferrodiazotrophum" Tyson et al. 2005
 Species L. ferriphilum Coram & Rawlings 2002
 Species L. ferrooxidans Markosyan 1972 ex Hippe 2000
 Species "L. rubarum" Aliaga Goltsman et al. 2009
 Species L. thermoferrooxidans Hippe 2000
 Class Nitrospiria Oren et al. 2015
 Order "Troglogloeales" Yu et al. 2022
 Genus "Candidatus Troglogloea" corrig. Kostanjsek et al. 2013
 Species "Ca. T. absolonii" corrig. Kostanjsek et al. 2013
 Family "Manganitrophaceae" Yu et al. 2022
 Genus "Candidatus Manganitrophus" Yu & Leadbetter 2020
 Species "Ca. M. morganii" Yu et al. 2022
 Species "Ca. M. noduliformans" Yu & Leadbetter 2020
 Order "Nitrospirales" Garrity & Holt 2001
 Family "Nitrospiraceae" Garrity & Holt 2001
 Genus "Ca. Magnetominusculus" Lin et al. 2017
 Species "Ca. M. xianensis" Lin et al. 2017
 Genus Nitrospira Watson et al. 1986
 Species "Ca. N. alkalitolerans" Daebeler et al. 2020
 Species "Ca. N. bockiana" Lebedeva et al. 2008
 Species N. calida Lebedeva et al. 2011
 Species N. defluvii Nowka et al. 2015
 Species "Ca. N. inopinata" Daims et al. 2015
 Species N. japonica Ushiki et al. 2013
 Species "Ca. N. kreftii" Sakoula et al. 2021
 Species N. lenta Nowka et al. 2015
 Species N. marina Watson et al. 1986 (type sp.)
 Species N. moscoviensis Ehrich et al. 1995
 Species "Ca. N. nitrificans" van Kessel et al. 2015
 Species "Ca. N. nitrosa" van Kessel et al. 2015
 Species "Ca. N. salsa" Haaijer et al. 2013
 Class Thermodesulfovibrionia Umezawa et al. 2021
 Order "Thermodesulfovibrionales" Umezawa et al. 2021
 Family Dissulfurispiraceae Umezawa et al. 2021
 Genus Dissulfurispira Umezawa et al. 2021
 Species D. thermophila Umezawa et al. 2021 
 Family Thermodesulfovibrionaceae Umezawa et al. 2021
 Genus "Candidatus Magnetobacterium" Spring et al. 1993
 Species "Ca. M. bavaricum" Spring et al. 1993
 Species "Ca. M. casense" corrig. Lin et al. 2014
 Genus "Candidatus Magnetovum" corrig. Lefevre et al. 2011
 Species "Ca. M. chiemensis" Kolinko 2014
 Species "Ca. M. mohavensis" Lefevre et al. 2011
 Genus "Candidatus Sulfobium" Zecchin et al. 2018
 Species "Ca. S. mesophilum" Zecchin et al. 2018
 Genus Thermodesulfovibrio Henry et al. 1994 emend. Sekiguchi et al. 2008
 Species T. aggregans Sekiguchi et al. 2008
 Species T. hydrogeniphilus Haouari et al. 2009
 Species T. islandicus Sonne-Hansen and Ahring 2000
 Species T. thiophilus Sekiguchi et al. 2008
 Species T. yellowstonii Henry et al. 1994 (type sp.)

See also 
 Nitrospira
 Nitrosomonas
 Nitrobacteraceae
 Nitrobacter
 Nitrogen cycle
 Nitrite
 Nitrate
 List of bacterial orders
Comammox

See also
 List of bacterial orders
 List of bacteria genera

References

Further reading

External links 

 
Bacteria phyla